Think I'm in Love may refer to:
"Think I'm in Love", a song by Diana Ross from her 1981 album Why Do Fools Fall in Love
"Think I'm in Love" (Eddie Money song), a song by Eddie Money from his 1982 album No Control
"Think I'm in Love", a song by Spiritualized from their 1997 album Ladies and Gentlemen We Are Floating in Space
"Think I'm in Love" (Beck song), a song by Beck from his 2006 album The Information
"Think I'm in Love Again", a song by Paul Anka from his 1981 album Both Sides of Love